This is a list of Hungarian football transfers for the 2013 summer transfer window by club. Only transfers of clubs in the OTP Bank Liga will be included.

The summer transfer window opened on 1 June 2013, although a few transfers may have taken place prior to that date. The window closed at midnight on 31 August 2013. Players without a club may join one at any time, either during or in between transfer windows.

OTP Bank Liga

Budapest Honvéd

In:

Out:

Debrecen

In:

Out:

Diósgyőr

In:

Out:

Ferencváros

In:

Out:

Győr

In:

Out:

Kaposvár

In:

Out:

Kecskemét

In:

Out:

Lombard-Pápa

In:

Out:

Mezőkövesd

In:

Out:

MTK Budapest

In:

Out:

Paks

In:

Out:

Pécs

In:

Out:

Puskás

In:

Out:

Szombathely

In:

Out:

Újpest

In:

Out:

Videoton

In:

Out:

Ness Liga

Ajka

In:

Out:

Balmazújváros

In:

Out:

Békéscsaba

In:

Out:

Cegléd

In:

Out:

Dunaújváros

In:

Out:

Gyirmót

In:

Out:

Kozármisleny

In:

Out:

Nyíregyháza

In:

Out:

Siófok

In:

Out:

Sopron

In:

Out:

Szigetszentmiklós

In:

Out:

Szolnok

In:

Out:

Tatabánya

In:

Out:

Vasas

In:

Out:

Várda

In:

Out:

Zalaegerszeg

In:

Out:

References

External links

Hungarian
Transfers summer
2013